Woodstock Academy (WA), founded in 1801, is a high school located in Woodstock, Connecticut, United States. The Academy, which describes itself as an independent school, serves residents from the Connecticut towns of Brooklyn, Canterbury, Eastford, Pomfret, Union, and Woodstock. The respective towns' taxpayers pay student tuition through municipal taxes, and therefore state agencies and the National Center for Education Statistics (NCES) categorize Woodstock as a public school.  The school also accepts tuition-paying students from surrounding towns and states as day students, and students from around the country and the world as residential students. The original Academy building located on the North Campus is well known for the pool located on the third floor.

History
In 1801 the school was organized by James and John McClellan, sons of Revolutionary War General Samuel McClellan. The Connecticut Legislature officially chartered the school in 1802.

In 1969 the Woodstock School Committee designated Woodstock Academy as the secondary public school of the town.

In 1977 the Connecticut State Freedom of Information Commission ruled that Woodstock Academy must make its records public. In July 1980 the Connecticut Supreme Court ruled that Woodstock Academy is a public agency, because it serves three Connecticut towns in the manner that a public high school would, and therefore it must release all of its financial records under the Connecticut Freedom of Information Act.

In 1990 the school was planning to end Latin classes due to a lack of interest and the idea that students should study modern languages.

In 2012 the school was trying to recruit students from other regions of the United States and international students.

Governance and service area
The school is not within any school district and is not controlled by any municipality; therefore it describes itself as an "independent school."
 The Connecticut State Department of Education does not list Woodstock in its list of non-public schools  and therefore considers Woodstock to be a "public school" because the state of Connecticut oversees the school. In 2006 Shane, Navratil, and Co., a financial auditor, described the school as private. Woodstock Academy is also independently funded by student tuition and a growing endowment. Woodstock is a member of the Connecticut Association of Boards of Education and the Connecticut Association of Independent Schools. The New England Association of Schools & Colleges, Incorporated accredits The Woodstock Academy as an "independent school".

A 1997 Hartford Courant article described the school as "a quasi- private, independent school", and another called it a "private school". A 1990 Worcester Telegram & Gazette article described the school as "a privately endowed secondary school incorporated by the state to act as the town's public high". The National Center for Education Statistics (NCES) categorizes Woodstock as public.

The school serves the towns of Woodstock, Eastford, Pomfret, Canterbury, Union, and Brooklyn. As of 1980 it is the only secondary school that serves the town of Woodstock. In 1980 the Associated Press stated that the school serves the three towns in a manner that a public high school would. The school is funded by student tuition, whether the tuition is paid by sending towns or individual families. In 1980 the Associated Press said that The Academy is "incorporated like a private school but functions like a public school." A board of thirty individuals from the region operates the school. The Connecticut Supreme Court in 1980 supported a decision from a lower court that the school has an obligation to release records to the public due to its function as a public school.

Facilities
Woodstock Academy has boarding facilities. The historic Woodstock Academy Classroom Building was constructed in 1873 and is listed on the National Register of Historic Places.
 Woodstock Academy – North Campus, 57 Academy Road, Woodstock, CT 06281
 Woodstock Academy – South Campus, 150 Route 169, Woodstock, CT 06281
 Woodstock Academy – Bentley Athletic Complex, 423 Route 169, Woodstock, CT 06281

It was announced in October 2016 that Woodstock Academy would purchase the nearby  Hyde School campus for $15 million. The funds were loaned from the federal government, with the loan from the Rural Development Program of the United States Department of Agriculture. Acquisition of the site, originally the campus of Annhurst College, was completed in 2017.

The school established a bus system between the two campuses and lengthened periods between classes. The purchase gave the school the three dormitories: it had plans to increase the number of dormitory students in a gradual manner based upon whether the numbers of zoned students decrease.

Demographics
In 2017 its enrollment was 1,050, with 94 of them categorized as international students.

Notable alumni and faculty
Henry Chandler Bowen, businessman, philanthropist, and newspaper publisher in New York City; original owner of Roseland Cottage in Woodstock
Augustus Sabin Chase (1828–1896), industrialist in Waterbury
Ernest Haskell, artist and illustrator
William L. Marcy, U.S. Senator, Governor of New York, U.S. Secretary of War, U.S. Secretary of State; negotiator of the Gadsden Purchase
Tre Mitchell, basketball player
James W. Patterson, U.S. Representative and U.S. Senator from New Hampshire
Ebenezer Stoddard, U.S. Representative from Connecticut
Theodore Stowell, president of Bryant University
Alexander Warner, Union Army officer, banker, planter, and Republican politician
Warren Wheaton, philanthropist, co-founder and namesake of Wheaton College and Wheaton, Illinois

See also
Other Connecticut private academies acting as public high schools:
 Gilbert School
 Norwich Free Academy

Other private academies acting as public high schools:
 Pinkerton Academy

References

External links

 

Woodstock, Connecticut
Educational institutions established in 1801
Schools in Windham County, Connecticut
Public high schools in Connecticut
1801 establishments in Connecticut
Boarding schools in Connecticut
Public boarding schools in the United States